Let's Do It may refer to:

General 
 Let's Do It 2008, an environmental cleanup campaign in Estonia
 Let's Do It! World, an international civic movement that originated from the Estonian campaign
 Let's do it! Armenia, an environmental cleanup campaign in Armenia
 "Let's do it!", the last words of the American criminal Gary Gilmore in 1977

Media 
  "Let's Do It", or "Let's Do It, Let's Fall in Love", popular song by Cole Porter
 Let's Do It (album) (1972), by Roy Ayers
 Let's Do It (TV series),  1974 Canadian sports instruction series
 "Let's Do It" (The L Word), 2002 episode of The L Word
 "Let's Do It" (Miranda),  episode of Miranda

See also
 "O Let's Do It", a song by Waka Flocka Flame
 Let's Do It Again (disambiguation)